Betiscoides is a small genus of southern African grasshoppers in the family Lentulidae.

The grasshoppers of the genus Betiscoides have slender or very slender bodies and they are flightless, lacking wings. They have a conical head and the antennae are tapering. They are all found among the reed-like wetland plants of the genus Restio and their common name is the restio grasshoppers. All three species are classified as Endangered on the IUCN Red List.

Species
There are three species in the genus Betiscoides:
 Betiscoides meridionalis Sjöstedt, 1923 – slender restio grasshopper
 Betiscoides parva Key, 1937 – small restio grasshopper
 Betiscoides sjostedti Key, 1937 – robust restio grasshopper

References

Lentulidae
Orthoptera of Africa
Taxa named by Bror Yngve Sjöstedt